Aachen Schanz station is a railway station in Aachen, Germany on the railway line Aachen–Mönchengladbach. The station is located at the western end of the inner city, and is the station with the shortest walking distance to the historic center or the Aachen Cathedral. Several bus lines to western Aachen stop here, including regional buses to Kelmis and Maastricht and the medical centers of the city (Luisenhospital, Franziskushospital, Alexianerkrankenhaus and Klinikum Aachen). It is not a bus hub, but some lines stop at the southern end (Jakobstraße) and some at the northern end (Vaalser Straße), depending on the route of the line.

The accessible developed station lies between Aachen Central Station and Aachen West station at the west end of downtown.

Services
All regional trains stop at this station; it is usually served four times per hour and direction.

References

External links
Map of Aachen Schanz station 
 Current departures 

Railway stations in North Rhine-Westphalia
Schanz station
Railway stations in Germany opened in 2004